At  boxing's beginning, the heavyweight division had no weight limit, and historically the weight class has gone with vague or no definition. During the 19th century many heavyweights were 170 pounds (12 st 2 lb, 77 kg) or less, though others weighed considerably more. John L. Sullivan was the first widely recognized champion under Marquess of Queensberry rules. Known as the "Boston Strong Boy," Sullivan weighed around 200 pounds when in shape, and helped transition the sport from its bare-knuckle era. Sullivan would be defeated for the title by "Gentleman" Jim Corbett over 21 rounds on September 7, 1892, the first heavyweight titleholder solely under Queensberry rules.

In 1920 a de facto minimum weight for a heavyweight was set at 175 pounds (12 st 7 lb, 79 kg) with the standardization of a weight limit for the light heavyweight division. The addition of the cruiserweight division, which began in 1979, reset the de facto minimum, first to 190 pounds and then to 200 pounds in 2004 when boxing's major sanctioning bodies universally raised the weight limit at which they'd recognize champions. The World Boxing Council created a new division called bridgerweight for boxers weighing between 200 and 225 pounds. As of June 2022 no other major organization has recognized the division.

The championship of the heavyweight division has been fractured or disputed at various times in its history. Until the 1960s, such disputes were settled in the ring, typically with alternate title claimants largely being forgotten. The rise of sanctioning organizations, however, have produced an environment where typically there is no single world heavyweight champion, with titleholders recognized by one of these organizations (a "World Champion") or more (a "Super Champion," a "Unified Champion," or, in the rare cases where the four most prominent organizations recognize the same boxer, an "Undisputed Champion").

Some title reigns are considered dubious owing to long periods of inactivity, the legitimacy of the organization granting championship recognition, and other factors. In 1967, for example, Muhammad Ali was denied a boxing license in every U.S. jurisdiction and stripped of his passport because of his refusal to be inducted into the armed forces. On April 29, 1967, his recognition as champion by both the World Boxing Association and World Boxing Council was withdrawn. Yet Ali remained the lineal champion and was recognized by The Ring magazine and most boxing purists until his defeat in 1971. In pursuit of greater revenues, some organizations have now adopted a practice of simultaneously recognizing multiple champions in a weight division, creating a situation in which a champion may be unable not only to secure recognition from multiple sanctioning bodies but to secure sole recognition from a single one.

Championship recognition

Public Acclamation:  1884 to 1921
World champions were initially recognized by wide public acclamation, with heavyweight champions winning and losing championship recognition solely in the ring.  Retirements periodically resulted in no one, true champion being recognized, while in other cases new champions were proclaimed only to see a previously recognized champion come out of retirement.  Public interest in boxing resulted in a true champion being determined by means of title claimants facing one another in the ring, with the winner being recognized as world champion.

The Ring Magazine:  1922 to present 
The Ring magazine has recognized heavyweight champions during two periods, commencing with its inaugural issue in 1922 and continuing until the 1990s, then again from 2002 to the present day.  Under its original policy, a champion earned championship recognition in the ring, defeating the preceding champion or winning a bout between its top rated contenders.  Once awarded, championship recognition could be lost only by death, retirement, or loss in the ring.  In 2012, this policy was revised so championship recognition could be more easily awarded or withdrawn.

Sanctioning Bodies:  1921 to present 
The National Boxing Association (NBA) was organized in 1921 to serve as a regulating authority for boxing in the United States.  The prominence of New York City as an epicenter of boxing would lead to its state boxing regulatory body, the New York State Athletic Commission (NYSAC) joining the NBA in recognizing world champions in each weight class.  A third entity, the European Boxing Union (IBU) would follow suit, but with limited exception in the heavyweight division the three organizations recognized the same champion.

At its 1962 convention, the NBA's non-United States members exploited a membership rule and took effective control of the organization, rebranding it as the World Boxing Association.  The now WBA would be joined the following year by a combination of state and national boxing commissions (including the NYSAC and IBU) to form a new organization, the World Boxing Council (WBC).  In time, each organization would have its own spin-off sanctioning organization break from its ranks:  the United States Boxing Association, which disassociated with the WBA in the late 1970s and became the International Boxing Federation in 1983, and the World Boxing Organization, whose members would split from the WBC in 1988. Today there are over a dozen sanctioning organizations which recognize champions and sanction world championship bouts, but the WBA, WBC, IBF, and WBO are recognized by the International Boxing Hall Of Fame as major sanctioning bodies.

Current status of prominent championship titles

List of champions

Footnotes
 Won vacant championship title.
 Voluntarily relinquished championship title.
 Championship recognition withdrawn by sanctioning organization upon his refusal to fight an opponent of the organization's designation.
 In 1882, Sullivan defeated Paddy Ryan to win the bare-knuckle championship of America.  A lack of legitimate challengers elsewhere gradually resulted in Sullivan earning worldwide recognition.  On August 29, 1885, he defeated Dominick McCaffrey in a bout described as "the Marquess of Queensberry glove contest for the championship of the world."
 Corbett announced his retirement from boxing in 1895, nominating Steve O'Donnell as his successor.  As tradition demanded the title be won in the ring, O'Donnell was matched against Peter Maher on November 11, 1895, at Maspeth, New York.  Maher won via first-round knockout, but the public generally didn't accept Maher and Maher himself expressed a desire to fight Corbett for the "real" title.  In Maher's next bout, Bob Fitzsimmons defeated him via first-round knockout on February 21, 1896.  Fitzsimmons in turn was defeated by Tom Sharkey of Dundalk on December 2, 1896, in a contest billed as for the heavyweight title.  Corbett announced his return to the ring shortly thereafter, at which time the championship claims of Maher, Fitzsimmons, and Sharkey were for the most part dismissed. Sharkey's title claims lapsed when he was defeated by Jeffries in May 1898.
 Jeffries announced his retirement, relinquishing the title and promoting a match between Marvin Hart and Jack Root for the championship.  Jeffries returned to the ring to challenge Jack Johnson.
 The British National Sporting Club withdrew its recognition of Johnson as champion when he refused to defend his title against the British champion William "Iron" Hague.  The NSC matched Hague with Canadian Sam Langford for its title on May 24, 1909.  Langford won via fourth-round knockout but never pursued a championship claim.
 Schmeling earned championship recognition by defeating Jack Sharkey by controversial disqualification.  The New York State Athletic Commission withdrew its recognition of Schmeling when he refused to grant Sharkey an immediate rematch.  The NYSAC did not recognize a champion until Sharkey defeated Schmeling in 1932.
 In late 1934, the International Boxing Union (IBU) ordered Baer to defend his title against European champion Pierre Charles of Belgium.  When Baer refused, the IBU sanctioned a bout between Charles and American George Godfrey for their title on October 2, 1935.  Godfrey won via fifteen-round decision but never pursued a championship claim.  The IBU ultimately recognized Baer's successor James J. Braddock as champion.
 Two months after Louis' retirement announcement, the International Boxing Union sanctioned a bout between British champion Bruce Woodcock and American Lee Savold for its version of the title.  The bout was not staged until June 1950, however, due to delays caused by injuries suffered by Woodcock in an automobile accident.  Meanwhile, Ezzard Charles defeated Jersey Joe Walcott to win the vacant National Boxing Association championship title.  Savold defeated Woodcock in four rounds to win the IBU title, while Charles gained New York State Athletic Commission recognition and wide public acclaim as champion upon defeating former champion Joe Louis in September 1950.  On June 15, 1951, Joe Louis defeated Savold via sixth-round knockout, after which the IBU withdrew its recognition of Savold and proclaimed Ezzard Charles as champion.
 Following Marciano's retirement, Patterson was matched against Tommy "Hurricane" Jackson in a championship eliminator on June 8, 1956.  Winning via controversial split decision, Patterson then faced light heavyweight titleholder Archie Moore for the vacant title.  Upon defeating Moore, Patterson fought (and defeated) Jackson a second time on July 29, 1957.
 The World Boxing Association withdrew their championship recognition of Clay (by then known as Muhammad Ali) upon agreeing to an immediate rematch against former champion Sonny Liston, in violation of WBA rules.  The newly founded World Boxing Council and other sanctioning groups continued to recognize Ali as champion.
 The World Boxing Association, World Boxing Council, New York State Athletic Commission and others withdrew their championship recognition of Ali following his refusal to be inducted into the United States Army subsequent to his conscription.
 To fill its vacant championship title, the World Boxing Association organized a single-elimination tournament involving eight of their ranked contenders (Joe Frazier, who was ranked No. 2, declined to participate): Oscar Bonavena, Jimmy Ellis, Leotis Martin, Karl Mildenberger, two-time former champion Floyd Patterson, Jerry Quarry, Thad Spencer, and former WBA champion Ernie Terrell.  In first round matches, Ellis defeated Martin, Quarry defeated Patterson, Spencer defeated Terrell, and Bonavena defeated Mildenberger.  In the semi-finals, Ellis defeated Bonavena while Quarry defeated Spencer; and Ellis defeated Quarry for the championship title.  Frazier, meanwhile, was matched against Buster Mathis for a championship recognized by the New York State Athletic Commission together with the commissions of Illinois, Maine, Massachusetts and Pennsylvania.  Similar "world" championship recognition was bestowed upon him by the Texas Athletic Commission following a victory over Dave Zyglewicz on April 22, 1969.
 Frazier defeated Ellis to unify the heavyweight championship, but did not gain World public acclaim as champion until defeating Muhammad Ali on March 8, 1971.
 In an unprecedented move, upon withdrawing its recognition of Leon Spinks as champion, the World Boxing Council immediately recognized Ken Norton as champion, based on an earlier victory over Jimmy Young.  As a condition of being named champion, Norton was ordered to face the WBC's new mandatory challenger, Larry Holmes within 120 days.
 Holmes relinquished his World Boxing Council championship and accepted championship recognition bestowed by the newly organized International Boxing Federation.
 Following its 1978 precedent, upon withdrawing championship recognition from Riddick Bowe, the World Boxing Council immediately awarded championship recognition to Lennox Lewis, on the basis of his victory in an October 31, 1992 "championship eliminator" over Donovan Ruddock.
 Following its withdrawal of recognition from George Foreman, the International Boxing Federation sanctioned a December 9, 1995, match between Francois Botha and Axel Schulz for its championship.  Botha won the bout by split decision, but the bout result and Botha's championship title were vacated after Botha's post-fight drug test revealed he had taken illegal anabolic steroids.  A subsequent bout between Schulz and Michael Moorer was sanctioned for the IBF championship.
 Upon defeating John Ruiz, Roy Jones Jr. simultaneously held the World Boxing Association's heavyweight and light heavyweight titles.  At his request, the WBA suspended its rule prohibiting simultaneous title holding.  It later declared Jones its "Champion in Recess," and sanctioned a December 13, 2003, bout between Ruiz and Hasim Rahman for its "interim" championship.  Ruiz won the bout.  On February 20, 2004, Jones relinquished his heavyweight title to resume boxing as a light heavyweight, at which point Ruiz was elevated to full championship recognition.  On April 30, 2005, Ruiz was defeated by James Toney in a championship defense, but post-fight drug testing determined Toney had taken Nandrolone, an anabolic steroid.  The bout's result was subsequently changed to a "no contest," whereupon the WBA reinstated Ruiz as champion.
 Following repeated injuries to champion Vitali Klitschko, the World Boxing Council sanctioned an August 13, 2005, bout between Hasim Rahman and Monte Barrett for its "interim" championship.  Rahman won the bout, and when Klitschko relinquished his title three months later, the WBC elevated Rahman to full championship recognition.
 Following repeated injuries which prevented him from defending his title, the World Boxing Association designated Chagaev a "Champion in Recess," sanctioning an August 30, 2008, bout between former champions John Ruiz and Nikolai Valuev for its "interim" title; a bout won by Valuev.  Upon his recovery however, Chagaev opted to face Wladimir Klitschko rather than Valuev, whereupon the WBA withdrew championship recognition.
 The World Boxing Association modified its championship structure, creating a new "Super Champion" status to be awarded to champions who hold multiple titles simultaneously.  Now subordinated to this was the status of "World Champion," commonly referred to as the "Regular" champion.  The organization then sanctioned a bout between Povetkin and former champion Ruslan Chagaev for this "regular" title.  Povetkin's reign as the WBA's "regular champion" ended upon a loss to "Super Champion" Wladimir Klitschko, at which point the "regular" title was vacant.
 Browne defeated Ruslan Chagaev for the World Boxing Association's "regular" championship title, but Browne subsequently tested positive for Clenbuterol, a banned substance.  Following confirmation of the positive result, the WBA withdrew its recognition of Browne's "regular" championship.
 On October 29, 1877, a fight between British fighters Tom Allen and Tompkin Gilbert at the Sadler's Wells Theatre, London was billed as for the World heavyweight title under Marquess of Queensberry Rules. Allen won in seven rounds.
 Bryan was due to fight Manuel Charr on January 29, 2021, for the WBA Regular championship, but Charr was unable to attain the right visa to come to the US, where the fight was to be held. Due to the long period of inactivity, Charr was stripped of the title and Bryan fought Bermane Stiverne for the now vacant title instead.

List of combined reigns

As of September 25, 2021.

Keys:
 Active title reign
 Reign has ended
WBO heavyweight title bouts before August 1997 are not included

List of individual reigns

The list includes The Ring belt. Career total time as champion (for multiple time champions) does not apply.

Keys:
 Active Title Reign
 Reign has ended
The WBO heavyweight title bouts before August 1997 are not included

By nationality

See also
 World heavyweight boxing championship records and statistics
 List of Olympic medalists in heavyweight boxing
 List of WBA heavyweight world champions
 List of WBA female heavyweight world champions
 List of WBC heavyweight world champions
 List of WBC female heavyweight world champions
 List of IBF heavyweight world champions
 List of IBF female heavyweight world champions
 List of WBO heavyweight world champions
 List of WBO female heavyweight world champions
 List of British world boxing champions

Further reading

References

Sources 
 
 Boxing Title Fights
 NBA World Heavyweight Champion - BoxRec
 NYSAC World Heavyweight Champion – BoxRec
 The BoxRec – Boxing's Official Record Keeper
 The BoxRec Wiki Encyclopedia
 The Boxing Register: International Boxing Hall Of Fame Official Record Book (archive)

Heavyweight champions

World boxing champions by weight class